An election was held for the office of Mayor of Auckland on 12 October 2013. It was one of many triennial local elections that took place in Auckland and throughout New Zealand at the time.

Background
Incumbent Len Brown appeared at number seven by the City Mayors Foundation's 2012 World Mayor list.

Candidates
Len Brown (independent), incumbent mayor
John Palino (independent), restaurant manager and former host of television show The Kitchen Job
John Minto (Mana Movement), activist
Penny Bright (independent), activist
Uesifili Unasa (independent), Christian minister
David Willmott (Roads First), stood for mayor in 2010
Stephen Berry (Affordable Auckland), also candidate for the Waitematā and Gulf ward
Jesse Butler
Paul Duffy
Susanna Kruger (independent)
Matthew Goode
Annalucia Vermunt (Communist League)
Emmett Hussey
Phil O'Connor (Christians Against Abortion)
Wayne Young, homeless man and protester, stood for mayor in 2010
Reuben Shadbolt, son of Invercargill mayor Tim Shadbolt
Julia Parfitt, chair of Hibiscus and Bays local board

Prospective candidates who did not stand
Maurice Williamson (National), MP for Pakuranga
Cameron Brewer (independent), councillor for the Orākei ward

Campaign
Brown's priority for the city was the funding and commencement of the City Rail Link, which had 63% public support in June 2009.

Palino ran on a conservative policy platform, and his campaign was managed by Communities and Residents president and former National Party president John Slater. He opposed the urban intensification of some Auckland communities, including those on the North Shore, instead proposing a second central business district model based in Manukau.

Postal ballots were sent to voters from 20 September.

Opinion polling
 – Some polls were taken after voting began on 20 September.

Results

By local board

Source:

Notes

References

Mayoral elections in Auckland
2013 elections in New Zealand
Auckland Council
2010s in Auckland
October 2013 events in New Zealand